Automeris godartii, or Godart's bullseye moth,  is a species of moth in the family Saturniidae and the subfamily Hemileucinae. The scientific name of the species was first published in 1875 by Jean Baptiste Boisduval. It is found in French Guiana, Peru and Venezuela.

References

Moths described in 1875
Hemileucinae
Moths of South America